Intel Turbo Boost is Intel's trade name for central processing units (CPUs) dynamic frequency scaling feature that automatically raises certain versions of its operating frequency when demanding tasks are running, thus enabling a higher resulting performance. 

The frequency is accelerated when the operating system requests the highest performance state of the processor. Processor performance states are defined by the Advanced Configuration and Power Interface (ACPI) specification, an open standard supported by all major operating systems; no additional software or drivers are required to support the technology. The design concept behind Turbo Boost is commonly referred to as "dynamic overclocking".

When the workload on the processor calls for faster performance, the processor's clock will try to increase the operating frequency in regular increments as required to meet demand. The increased clock rate is limited by the processor's power, current, and thermal limits, the number of cores currently in use, and the maximum frequency of the active cores. 

Turbo-Boost-enabled processors are the Core i3, Core i5, Core i7, Core i9 and Xeon series manufactured since 2008, more particularly, those based on the Nehalem, and later microarchitectures.

Support across CPUs 
Frequency increases occur in increments of 133 MHz for Nehalem processors and 100 MHz for Sandy Bridge, Ivy Bridge, Haswell and Skylake processors. When any electrical or thermal limits are exceeded, the operating frequency automatically decreases in decrements of 133 or 100 MHz until the processor is again operating within its design limits.  Turbo Boost 2.0 was introduced in 2011 with the Sandy Bridge microarchitecture, while Intel Turbo Boost Max 3.0 was introduced in 2016 with the Broadwell-E microarchitecture.

A feature of Turbo Boost 2.0 is that it introduced time windows with different levels of power limits, so that a processor can boost to a higher frequency for a few seconds. These limits are configurable in software for unlocked processors. Some motherboard vendors intentionally use values higher than Intel's default for performance, causing the processor to exceed its thermal design power (TDP).

Some Intel Core X Processors and some newer Intel Core Processors (e.g. 10th Gen Desktop Core i7) support Intel Turbo Boost Max 3.0 Technology. Newer version Windows 10 and Linux kernel support Intel Turbo Boost Max 3.0 Technology.

History 

An Intel November 2008 white paper discusses "Turbo Boost" technology as a new feature incorporated into Nehalem-based processors released in the same month.

A similar feature called Intel Dynamic Acceleration (IDA) was available on many Core 2 based Centrino platforms. This feature did not receive the marketing treatment given to Turbo Boost. Intel Dynamic Acceleration dynamically changed the core frequency as a function of the number of active cores. When the operating system instructed one of the active cores to enter C3 sleep state using the Advanced Configuration and Power Interface (ACPI), the other active core(s) dynamically accelerated to a higher frequency.

Intel Turbo Boost Technology Monitor, as a GUI utility, could be used to monitor Turbo Boost; this utility has reached the end-of-life state by no longer supporting Intel processors released after Q2 2013, and is no longer available.

See also 

 AMD PowerTune
 AMD Turbo Core
 Cool'n'Quiet
 Dynamic frequency scaling
 PowerNow!
 SpeedStep
 Turbo button

References

External links
Intel Turbo Boost Technology 2.0
Intel program to graphically show Turbo Boost
Intel® Turbo Boost Technology Monitor overview
Turbo Boost reporting tool for Linux
Evaluation of the Intel Core i7 Turbo Boost feature, by James Charles, Preet Jassi, Ananth Narayan S, Abbas Sadat and Alexandra Fedorova

X86 architecture
Intel microprocessors
Computer hardware tuning